113 (one hundred [and] thirteen) is the natural number following 112 and preceding 114.

Mathematics
 113 is the 30th prime number (following 109 and preceding 127),  so it can only be divided by one and itself. 113 is a Sophie Germain prime, an emirp, an isolated prime, a Chen prime and a Proth prime as it is a prime number of the form 7 × 24 + 1. 113 is also an Eisenstein prime with no imaginary part and real part of the form . In base 10, this prime is a primeval number, and a permutable prime with 131 and 311.
113 is a highly cototient number and a centered square number.

See also
 113 (disambiguation)
 A113 is a Pixar recurring inside joke or Easter Egg, e.g.: (WALL-E) = (W-A113).

References

 Wells, D. The Penguin Dictionary of Curious and Interesting Numbers London: Penguin Group. (1987): 134

Integers